Walter Uriel Mazzantti (born 5 September 1996) is an Argentine footballer who plays for Huachipato.

References

External links

1996 births
Living people
Argentine footballers
Argentine expatriate footballers
Argentine people of Italian descent
Association football wingers
Footballers from Buenos Aires
Club Atlético Tigre footballers
C.D. Huachipato footballers
Argentine Primera División players
Chilean Primera División players
Argentine expatriate sportspeople in Chile
Expatriate footballers in Chile